The 1975–76 Michigan State Spartans men's basketball team represented Michigan State University in the 1975–76 NCAA Division I men's basketball season as members of the Big Ten Conference. They played their home games at Jenison Fieldhouse in East Lansing, Michigan and were coached by Gus Ganakas in his seventh and final year as head coach of the Spartans. MSU finished the season 14–13, 10–8 in Big Ten play to finish in fourth place.

Ganakas was fired as head coach after the season due, in part to the walk-out of black players in 1975 and as part of an athletic department purge. Ganakas would continue as an assistant athletic director for MSU until 1998.

Previous season 
The Spartans finished the 1974–75 season 17–9, 10–8 in Big Ten play to finish in fifth place.

Roster and statistics 

Source

Schedule and results 

|-
!colspan=9 style=| Non-conference regular season

|-
!colspan=9 style=| Big Ten regular season

Awards and honors
 Terry Furlow – All-Big Ten First Team
 Terry Furlow – Big Ten Scoring Champion (31.0 ppg in-conference)

References 

Michigan State Spartans men's basketball seasons
Michigan State
Michigan State Spartans men's b
Michigan